The Childcare Voucher Scheme was a UK government initiative aimed at helping working parents to benefit from tax efficiencies in order to save money on childcare.  However, as of 4 October 2018, schemes are closed to new members as the system was phased out in favour of the tax-free childcare scheme. The scheme was offered as a salary sacrifice scheme, which means that UK parents who are in the scheme can sacrifice part of their salary to obtain childcare vouchers (of an equal amount). In doing this the parents do not pay any tax or national insurance on the amount contributed to the childcare vouchers scheme up to specified limits. Due to this tax efficiency, the childcare voucher scheme has limits in place, after which you would pay for childcare in the usual taxable fashion.

For example, a parent given £55 per week (£243 per month) in Childcare Vouchers after taking a salary sacrifice of the same amount, will then benefit by saving up to £933 tax/NIC.

Benefits 
The nature of the scheme has allowed many businesses to benefit from running a scheme too. Although initially aimed at UK working parents, by providing a scheme businesses essentially lowered their own national insurance contributions as the vouchers are exempt from employer's NICs.  Businesses also found other benefits in an increase in staff satisfaction and a reduction in staff turnover, saving indirectly on costs such as employing and training staff.

Eligibility 
UK working parents earning under a certain amount are eligible. The scheme is not provided on a per-child basis, but on a per-person basis, so both parents can claim under the scheme rules. The scheme can be available at the same time as working tax credits, however, this may not always be beneficial. Employees who are currently enrolled and have been since the closure of the scheme are still eligible to utilise the scheme.

Obtaining vouchers 
Childcare vouchers are provided either by an employer, usually through a childcare voucher scheme provider that an employer chooses.

History 
The Childcare Voucher Scheme was first introduced by Sue Harvey, Managing Director of the Luncheon Voucher Group in 1989. Since then many people have benefited from using the scheme. In 2009 a petition was started on the "Number 10" website in order to stop the government from shutting down the scheme. Due to the recession the government had been considering shutting the scheme down and therefore, earning a lot more in tax, however, Gordon Brown the Prime Minister at the time, decided against it. The petition finished with 93,000 signatories on it, and although now closed, it is still available for viewing. In April 2011, the government did make cuts to the scheme ensuring that high earners benefited less from the scheme. This is achieved by restricting the amounts that higher and additional rate taxpayers can receive tax and NI exempt.

 Basic rate taxpayers can have up to £55 a week (£243 a month) tax and NI exempt
 Higher rate taxpayers can have up to £28 a week (£124 a month) tax and NI exempt
 Additional rate taxpayers can have up to £25 a week (£110 a month) tax and NI exempt

The restrictions only apply to those who joined the scheme on or after 6 April 2011.  Those who were already receiving childcare vouchers on this date can receive £243 a month tax and NI exempt until they stop receiving vouchers for longer than 12 months, change employer or no longer qualify for the scheme.

On 29 March 2018, as part of The Income Tax (Limited Exemptions for Qualifying Childcare Vouchers and other Childcare) (Relevant Day) Regulations 2018 it was announced that Childcare vouchers would close to new members as of 4 October 2018.  Those still on a scheme on that date can continue to use childcare vouchers until such time as they change employers or switch to the tax-free childcare scheme.

References

External links
 Government better off Calculator

Taxation in the United Kingdom
Child care